The Idaho ground squirrel has been split into the following species:
 Northern Idaho ground squirrel, Urocitellus brunneus
 Southern Idaho ground squirrel, Urocitellus endemicus